Megachile lucidifrons is a species of bee in the family Megachilidae. It was described by Ferton in 1905.

References

Lucidifrons
Insects described in 1905